Produce 101 China is Chinese reality competition show and a spin-off of the South Korean television series Produce 101. 101 trainees, aged 15–28 years old who are many talent agencies, will be competing to debut in an 11-member girl band, with members selected by live voting from the viewers.

Contestants

Group Battle Performances (Episode 3)

Color key

Position Evaluation Performances (Episode 6)

Color key

Bold denotes the person who picked the team members (highest ranking trainees from the previous round of eliminations)

Concept Evaluation Performances (Episode 8)

Color key

 Popularity Queen

Bold denotes centres picked in the previous episode

Notes

References

 
Produce 101 China contestants
Produce 101 China contestants
Produce 101 China contestants
Produce 101 China contestants